Better Together may refer to:

Gaming 
 Bukkit, also known as Better Together, a 2017 Minecraft update allowing cross-platform multiplayer gameplay between Xbox One, Microsoft Windows, Nintendo Switch, iOS and Android

Music 
 Better Together (album), a 2016 album by the Gaither Vocal Band
 Better Together (EP), the 2013 debut EP of Fifth Harmony and the title track thereof
 Better Together: The Duet Album, a 1991 compilation album by Johnny Mathis
 "Better Together" (Jack Johnson song), 2005
 "Better Together" (Hayden James song), 2018
 "Better Together" (Luke Combs song), 2020

Politics 
 Better Together (campaign), the political campaign for a "No" vote in the Scottish independence referendum, 2014
 Better Together (programme), an initiative of the Scottish National Health Service
 Better Together: Restoring the American Community, a book and initiative by Robert Putnam

Television 
 Better with You, a 2010 ABC romantic comedy television series, which was also known as Better Together, Couples, Leapfrog, and That Couple